The 2013 Central Java gubernatorial election was held on 26 May 2013 to elect the Governor of Central Java for a five-year term, from 2013 to 2018. Three candidates contested the election, incumbent governor Bibit Waluyo as a member of the Democratic Party, Ganjar Pranowo of the Indonesian Democratic Party of Struggle (PDI-P), and Hadi Prabowo of the Prosperous Justice Party (PKS). The election was won by Ganjar Pranowo, who won with 6,962,417 (48.82%) votes in accordance with the Central Java Provincial General Election Commission decision on June 4, 2013.

Candidates 
This general election was contested by three candidates. Incumbent, Bibit Waluyo, ran for re-election with Sudijono, the Chancellor of the State University of Semarang. The PDI-P (who had supported Waluyo in the 2008 election), brought Ganjar Pranowo, a member of the People's Representative Council as a candidate, together with Heru Sudjatmoko who was serving as the Regent of Purbalingga. Interestingly, the deputy governor of Central Java, Rustriningsih which had been predicted to be promoted by the PDI-P, was not nominated. According to some the PDI-P considered that Rustri was not polite in politics. Meanwhile Hadi Prabowo, the Regional Secretary of Central Java ran with the Regent of Sumedang, Don Murdono.

Results

References 

Central Java
2013 Indonesian gubernatorial elections